Thirubuvanam is a panchayat town in Thanjavur district in the Indian state of Tamil Nadu. The town is mainly known for the Kampaheswarar Temple.

Demographics
 India census, Thirubuvanam had a population of 14,139. Males constitute 50% of the population and females 50%. Thirupuvanam has an average literacy rate of 70%, higher than the national average of 59.5%: male literacy is 77%, and female literacy is 63%. In Thirupuvanam, 11% of the population is under 6 years of age.

The population consists primarily of silk weavers.

There is an ancient Kampaheswarar Temple in  Thirubuvanam.

Thirubuvanam is very near the Cauvery River and is known as a manufacturing hub for silk sari and clothing materials, which is also located in the state of Tamil Nadu.

Hand woven silk saris and clothing materials in this ancient and emerging modern state of India have their brands and their respective values associated with the town or village of origin. In this respect Thirubuvanam silk saris are famous and accepted as the silk saris from the delta of the mighty and life-giving Cauvery river from which there are several tributaries flowing in this delta region.

Thico silks 
Thico Silks - The Thirubuvanam Silk handloom weavers Cooperative Production and Sale Society Limited, Thirubuvanam was started with the twin purpose of preserving the art of silk-weaving and uplifting the life of the artistically rich but economically poor weavers of this region. This society was started with an investment of ten thousand rupees in 1955, now does business to the tune of 43 crores a year The head office is located at Thirubuvanam, situated just 6 kilometres away from Kumbakonam it has 39 other branches spread across Tamil Nadu

External links
Thirubuvanam
 Thirubuvanam's Magnificent Chola Temple
  Thico Silks

References

Cities and towns in Thanjavur district